WMC Mortgage Corporation, also known as WMC or WMC Direct, was a Woodland Hills, California
based wholesale originator of subprime residential mortgages.

The company was founded in 1955 as Pacific Western Mortgage Company.  It went through several mergers and became known as Weyerhaeuser Mortgage Company (owned by Weyerhaeuser). In the late 1990s it was sold to private equity firm Apollo Global Management, and entered the subprime mortgage lending business.  GE Money (formerly GE Consumer Finance), owned by General Electric, bought WMC Mortgage in 2004 for about $500 million.  WMC Mortgage catered to consumers with less than perfect borrower profiles.  The company was among the largest subprime lenders  in the United States, ranking seventh in 2005 and fifth in 2006 in the dollar volume of subprime mortgage originations. The original domain for WMC Mortgage was www.wmcmortgage.com

GE ceased WMC's operations in late 2007 due to the subprime market collapse.
GE's WMC Mortgage unit filed for Chapter 11 bankruptcy.

References

External links 
 News report by Michael Hudson, iWatch News - Fraud and Folly: The Untold Story of General Electric’s Subprime Debacle (Friday 13 January 2012)

Mortgage lenders of the United States
Subprime mortgage lenders
Subprime mortgage crisis